Dylan Carter (born 30 January 1996) is a Trinidad and Tobago competitive swimmer. He is the Trinidad and Tobago record holder in the long course and short course 100 metre freestyle, 50 metre backstroke, 100 metre backstroke, 50 metre butterfly, and 100 metre butterfly. At the 2021 World Short Course Championships, he became the first swimmer representing Trinidad and Tobago to win a silver medal a World Short Course Championships, winning the silver medal in the 50 metre butterfly. In 2018 and 2022, he won the bronze medal in the 50 metre butterfly and the 50 metre freestyle at the World Short Course Championships, respectively. He was the male overall winner for the 2022 FINA Swimming World Cup, winning nine gold medals, five in Trinidad and Tobago record times, to become the first Trinidad and Tobago overall winner.

International career

2016–2018
Carter competed at the 2016 Summer Olympics in Rio de Janeiro, in the men's 100 metre freestyle. Later in 2016, Carter competed at the FINA Short Course World Championships where he made the final in the 200m freestyle and finished 4th. He also finaled in the 50m butterfly where he finished 7th. Carter won the silver medal at the 2018 Commonwealth Games in the 50 m butterfly. Collegiately, he competed for the University of Southern California under head coach Dave Salo where he won 4 NCAA titles as a part of USCs relay team.

2019: Backstroke on the rise

2019 World Championships
In July 2019 at the 2019 World Aquatics Championships, which took place in Gwangju, South Korea, Carter and Simone Sabbioni of Italy had wedge equipment malfunction during their starts in the 100 metre backstroke. Officials required Carter and Sabbioni to re-swim the race alone, one at a time, after the malfunction was ruled due to the wedge apparatus failure if they wanted to compete in the semifinals. In his re-swim, Carter advanced to the semifinals with his time of 54.03 seconds where he placed 16th overall with a time of 54.08 seconds.

2021: Butterfly national records

2020 Summer Olympics

At the 2020 Summer Olympics in Tokyo, Japan and held in July and August 2021 due to the COVID-19 pandemic, Carter competed in four individual events. In the 100 metre butterfly, Carter ranked 33rd and set a new national record with his time of 52.36 seconds. For his other three individual events, Carter ranked 33rd in the 50 metre freestyle with a time of 22.46 seconds, 22nd in the 100 metre freestyle with a 48.66, and 32nd in the 100 metre backstroke in a time of 54.82 seconds.

International Swimming League
During match nine of the 2021 International Swimming League in Naples, Italy, Carter took third place in the short course 50 metre butterfly with a time of 22.36, which broke the Trinidad and Tobago national record in the event he had previously set at 22.38 seconds in 2018.

2021 World Short Course Championships

On 20 December 2021, Carter won the silver medal in the 50 metre butterfly in a Trinidad and Tobago record time of 21.98 seconds at the 2021 World Short Course Championships held at Etihad Arena in Abu Dhabi, United Arab Emirates. His silver medal was the first medal other than a bronze medal to be won by a swimmer representing Trinidad and Tobago at a World Short Course Championships. He also placed ninth in the semifinals of the 100 metre butterfly with a Trinidad and Tobago record time of 49.87 seconds. For his accomplishments, Carter received congratulations from the Trinidad and Tobago Minister of Sport and Community Development, Shamfa Cudjoe.

2022

2022 World Aquatics Championships
At the 2022 World Aquatics Championships, held at Danube Arena in Budapest, Hungary with swimming competition in June, Carter placed fourth in the 50 metre butterfly with a Trinidad and Tobago record time of 22.85 seconds and place fourteenth in the 100 metre freestyle with a Trinidad and Tobago record time of 48.30 seconds.

2022 Swimming World Cup
At the first stop of the 2022 FINA Swimming World Cup, in Berlin, Germany, Carter won the gold medal in the 50 metre freestyle with a Trinidad and Tobago record time of 20.77 seconds, finishing 0.27 seconds ahead of silver medalist Kyle Chalmers of Australia and 0.28 seconds ahead of bronze medalist Florent Manaudou of France. The following day, he won the gold medal in the 50 metre backstroke with a Trinidad and Tobago record and personal best time of 23.15 seconds, finishing 0.07 seconds ahead of silver medalist Thomas Ceccon of Italy. Day three, he won a third gold medal, this time finishing first in the 50 metre butterfly with a 22.13, which was less than one-tenth of a second ahead of silver medalist Chad le Clos of South Africa. His scores across all of his events in Berlin ranked him as the second highest-scoring male competitor with 57.3 points, which was only 1.0 point behind first-ranked Matthew Sates of South Africa.

For the 50 metre freestyle on day one of the second stop of the World Cup circuit, starting 28 October in Toronto, Canada, Carter won the gold medal with a time of 20.91 seconds, which was less than two-tenths of a second ahead of silver medalist Brooks Curry of the United States and bronze medalist Kyle Chalmers. The following day, he won the gold medal in the 50 metre backstroke with a Trinidad and Tobago record time of 22.94 seconds, lowering his record mark from the first stop by over two-tenths of a second. In the same session, approximately 30 minutes later, he placed fourth in the final of the 100 metre freestyle with a Trinidad and Tobago record time of 46.36 seconds. He brought his medal count for the World Cup to six gold medals on the third and final day in Toronto, winning the gold medal in the 50 metre butterfly with a time of 22.28 seconds, which was less than four-tenths of a second ahead of silver medalist Chad le Clos and bronze medalist Thomas Ceccon.

Starting off the third and final stop, held in Indianapolis, United States with competition commencing on 3 November, Carter won a gold medal in the 50 metre freestyle in a Trinidad and Tobago record time of 20.72 seconds, the medal marked his seventh gold medal of the circuit. The next day, he finished in a Trinidad and Tobago record, US Open record, and personal best time of 22.72 seconds in the final of the 50 metre backstroke to win the gold medal, a time which was 0.22 seconds faster than his previous best mark and 0.11 seconds slower than the World Cup record of 22.61 seconds set in 2009 by Peter Marshall of the United States. Day three of three, he won the gold medal in the 50 metre butterfly with a US Open record time of 21.99 seconds. His win brought his final score across all three stops of the 2022 World Cup to 172.6 points for his nine gold medals spanning freestyle, backstroke, and butterfly, which earned him the title of overall male winner, highest scoring competitor from any country and across all strokes, for the year. He was the first swimmer representing Trinidad and Tobago in competition, and first Caribbean Islands swimmer, to win an overall title.

2022 World Short Course Championships

In December, at the 2022 World Short Course Championships in Melbourne, Australia, Carter commenced competition with a 22.11 in the preliminaries of the 50 metre butterfly on day one, qualifying for the semifinals later in the day ranking fourth. He lowered his time to a 22.02 in the evening semifinals, qualifying for the final ranking second. The following evening, he finished in a time of 22.14 seconds in the final to place sixth. For the preliminaries of the 50 metre backstroke on day three, he ranked fourth and advanced to the final with a time of 23.07 seconds. Later in the day, he tied Lorenzo Mora of Italy for firth-rank in the semifinals with a time of 22.90 seconds and both qualified for the final.

On day four, Carter achieved a Trinidad and Tobago record time of 20.70 seconds in the preliminaries of the 50 metre freestyle and qualified for the evening semifinals ranking second. In the evening session for the day, he started off with a seventh-place finish in the final of the 50 metre backstroke in a time of 23.12 seconds. He concluded the evening session in a tie for fifth-rank with Lewis Burras of Great Britain in the semifinals of the 50 metre freestyle with a time of 20.94 seconds. He won the first medal of the competition for Trinidad and Tobago in the final, finishing third in a time of 20.72 seconds to win the bronze medal.

2023
At the 2023 TYR Pro Swim Series in March in Fort Lauderdale, United States, Carter won the gold medal with a personal best and Trinidad and Tobago record time of 48.28 seconds.

International championships (50 m)

International championships (25 m)

Personal best times

Long course metres (50 m pool)

Short course metres (25 m pool)

Swimming World Cup circuits
The following medals Carter has won at Swimming World Cup circuits.

Awards
 SwimSwam Swammy Award Central American and Caribbean Athlete of the Year (male): 2018, 2020, 2021

References

External links

1996 births
Living people
Sportspeople from Santa Clara, California
Swimmers from California
Trinidad and Tobago male swimmers
Olympic swimmers of Trinidad and Tobago
Swimmers at the 2016 Summer Olympics
Swimmers at the 2020 Summer Olympics
Swimmers at the 2014 Summer Youth Olympics
Swimmers at the 2014 Commonwealth Games
Swimmers at the 2018 Commonwealth Games
Swimmers at the 2022 Commonwealth Games
Swimmers at the 2015 Pan American Games
Swimmers at the 2019 Pan American Games
Commonwealth Games medallists in swimming
Commonwealth Games silver medallists for Trinidad and Tobago
Central American and Caribbean Games gold medalists for Trinidad and Tobago
Central American and Caribbean Games silver medalists for Trinidad and Tobago
Central American and Caribbean Games bronze medalists for Trinidad and Tobago
Competitors at the 2018 Central American and Caribbean Games
Pan American Games medalists in swimming
Pan American Games bronze medalists for Trinidad and Tobago
Central American and Caribbean Games medalists in swimming
Medalists at the 2019 Pan American Games
USC Trojans men's swimmers
Medalists at the FINA World Swimming Championships (25 m)
Medallists at the 2018 Commonwealth Games